Duane Anthony Clemons (born May 23, 1974) is a former American Football defensive end who played in the National Football League between 1996 and 2005.  He was a first-round selection in the 1996 NFL Draft out of the University of California, Berkeley by the Minnesota Vikings.

He finished his NFL career with 49.5 sacks.  Despite struggling to see the field as a starter (16 starts in 4 years with Minnesota), Clemons proved a very capable sack artist.  In 1997, he finished with 7.0 sacks, 2 forced fumbles, and 24 tackles.  In 1999, he finished with a career-best 9.0 sacks and 36 tackles.

On November 10, 1999, Clemons was fined $7,500 for intentionally punching Flozell Adams in the testes following an interception two days earlier during a Monday Night Football game against the Dallas Cowboys. While Adams maintained that he didn't know why Clemons punched him, Clemons stated that he threw the punch because Adams illegally took him down from behind on an interception return.

In 2000, he went to the Kansas City Chiefs, where he finished with 7.5 sacks and a career-best 56 tackles.  The next year, 2001, he finished with 7.0 sacks and 48 tackles.  In 2003, he found himself with the Cincinnati Bengals, where he recorded 6.0 sacks, a career-best 4 pass deflections, and 42 tackles.  In 2004, he finished with 6.5 sacks and 49 tackles.

On September 8, 2008, Clemons signed with the Toronto Argonauts of the Canadian Football League and was assigned to their practice roster, but was released by the team on September 15, 2008.  He is currently the defensive line coach for the MidAmerica Nazarene University Pioneers.

References

1974 births
Living people
Players of American football from Riverside, California
American football defensive ends
California Golden Bears football players
Minnesota Vikings players
Kansas City Chiefs players
Cincinnati Bengals players